Rowland "Bill" Ockleshaw (19 December 1876 – 30 March 1951) was an Australian rules footballer who played with St Kilda in the Victorian Football League (VFL).

References

External links 

1876 births
1951 deaths
Australian rules footballers from Victoria (Australia)
St Kilda Football Club players
Australian rules footballers from New South Wales